Rhiane Smith (born 17 May 1974) is a New Zealand former cricketer. He played six first-class and eleven List A matches for Otago between 1992 and 1996.

See also
 List of Otago representative cricketers

References

External links
 

1974 births
Living people
New Zealand cricketers
Otago cricketers
People from the Catlins